Alexandra Rose "Alix" Klineman (born December 30, 1989) is an American beach volleyball, 2020 Summer Olympics gold medalist, and former indoor volleyball player.

In high school she was the 2006 Gatorade National Player of the Year. She was a four-time All-American in volleyball at Stanford University, and the 2010 Volleyball Magazine national player of the year. She won a bronze medal with Team USA at the 2011 Pan American Games.

Switching to beach volleyball, she was named part of the 2018 Association of Volleyball Professionals Team of the Year (along with April Ross), and individually honored with the 2018 and 2019 Best Blocker awards.

Early life
Klineman was born in Torrance, California, to Mike and Kathie Klineman, raised in Manhattan Beach, California, and is Jewish. She has an older brother, Max, and a sister, Maddy. She is 6'5" (1.96 m) in height.

High school
Klineman graduated from Mira Costa High School in Manhattan Beach, California in 2007. She was named the 2005 and 2006 California Gatorade State Player of the Year for Volleyball, and the 2006 Gatorade National Player of the Year. She was also the 2004 and 2006 California State Championship most valuable player, PrepVolleyball.com 2004 Sophomore Player of the Year and 2006 Senior Player of the Year, and a three-time PrepVolleyball.com High School All-American.  She led Mira Costa to three consecutive California State Championships, and three consecutive Southern Section CIF Championships. In indoor volleyball, Klineman is an outside hitter.

College
She played indoor college women's volleyball at Stanford University for the Stanford Cardinal women's volleyball team in 2007–2010. She was the 2010 Volleyball Magazine Player of the Year as a college senior, a multi American Volleyball Coaches Association (AVCA) All-American, the Pac-10 Conference Player of the Year, and an All-Conference selection all four years. Klineman was also the AVCA National Freshman of the Year, leading the Cardinal to the NCAA Finals, and she made the NCAA All-Tournament Team. She finished her college career second at Stanford and fifth all-time in Pac-10 history with 2,008 kills. In 2010 she ranked second in the US with 5.55 kills per set and 6.25 points per set,

Team USA
She was on the USA Junior National Women's Volleyball Team and a member of the United States women's national volleyball team. She helped the U.S. Girls’ Youth National Team win a gold medal at the 2004 North, Central America and Caribbean Volleyball Confederation (NORCECA) Girls’ Youth Continental Championship, and a gold medal at the 2006 NORCECA Women's Junior Continental Championship. Klineman was a training member of the United States women's national volleyball team.  She won a bronze medal with the US in  volleyball at the 2011 Pan American Games.

Professional indoor volleyball career
She also played volleyball in Italy from 2011 to 2015 for Volley Pesaro, Gruppo Sportivo Oratorio Villa Cortese, and AGIL Volley Novara, and with Praia Clube in Brazil for two years. She tested positive for anabolic androgenic steroids in 2013 and was suspended for 13 months. According to Klineman, the positive results were due to unintentional ingestion of her mother's DHEA supplement.

Beach volleyball career

In 2017, Klineman left indoor volleyball to focus on beach volleyball full-time, and was named the Association of Volleyball Professionals (AVP) Rookie of the Year. At the end of 2017, Klineman and April Ross became beach volleyball partners.

Klineman and Ross won the FIVB Dela Beach Open in January 2018, which was the first tournament they played together. During the 2018 AVP Pro Beach Volleyball Tour, Klineman and Ross won four tournament events: the Austin Open, the Manhattan Beach Open, the Championships (in Chicago), and the Hawaii Invitational. In mid-October 2018, Klineman and Ross won their second FIVB tournament event, earning the gold medal over Brazil at the Yangzhou Open. Klineman was named part of the AVP Team of the Year (along with April Ross), and individually honored with the Best Blocker and Most Improved Player awards at the AVP Award Banquet that November.

In 2019, Klineman's success with Ross continued as they won the Huntington Beach and New York City Open AVP tour events, and won the FIVB Itapema Open mid-May. They also won the silver medal at the 2019 Beach Volleyball World Championships in Hamburg, Germany. Klineman was again named Best Blocker.

In July 2020, the two won the AVP Monster Hydro Cup and the Wilson Cup, and in August they won the AVP Champions Cup.

On August 6, 2021, Klineman and Ross captured the gold medal at the 2020 Summer Olympics, after winning in straight sets versus Australia. In the entire tournament, they went undefeated in match play, only losing one set throughout seven matches. Two weeks later, the pair won the AVP Manhattan Beach Open, their second time winning this tournament together.

Awards

Clubs
 2014–15 Italian Women's Volleyball League –  Silver medal, with AGIL Volley.
 2015–16 Brazilian Women's Volleyball Superliga –  Silver medal, with Dentil Praia Clube.
 2017 South American Club Championship –  Silver medal, with Dentil Praia Clube.

Individual

 2015 Inducted into the Southern California Jewish Sports Hall of Fame
 2017 South American Club Championship "Best Outside Hitter"
 2018 AVP Team of the Year (with April Ross)
 2018 AVP Most Improved Player
 2018 AVP Best Blocker
 2019 AVP Best Blocker

See also
List of Jews in sports

References

External links
 
 
 

1989 births
Living people
American women's volleyball players
American women's beach volleyball players
Outside hitters
Jewish women's volleyball players
Jewish American sportspeople
Pan American Games bronze medalists for the United States
Pan American Games medalists in volleyball
Stanford Cardinal women's volleyball players
American expatriate sportspeople in Italy
American expatriate sportspeople in Brazil
Expatriate volleyball players in Italy
Expatriate volleyball players in Brazil
Serie A1 (women's volleyball) players
Sportspeople from Manhattan Beach, California
Sportspeople from Torrance, California
Doping cases in volleyball
Volleyball players at the 2011 Pan American Games
Medalists at the 2011 Pan American Games
Beach volleyball players at the 2020 Summer Olympics
Medalists at the 2020 Summer Olympics
Olympic medalists in beach volleyball
Olympic gold medalists for the United States in volleyball
21st-century American Jews
21st-century American women
Mira Costa High School alumni